The Military Order of Saint Benedict of Aviz, previously to 1910 Royal Military Order of Saint Benedict of Aviz, previously to 1789 Knights (of the Order) of Saint Benedict of Aviz or Friars of Santa Maria of Évora, is a Portuguese order of chivalry, founded in Portugal in 1146. It gave its name and coat of arms to the Aviz Dynasty that ruled Portugal between 1385 and 1580.

Early history
The order, as a monastic military order,  was founded in emulation of such military orders as the Knights Templar, which existed in Portugal as early as 1128, and received a grant from Theresa, Countess of Portugal in the year of the Council of Troyes, which confirmed their early statutes. A native order of this kind sprang up in Portugal about 1146. Afonso, the first king, gave to it the town of Évora, captured from the Moors in 1166, and the Knights were first called "Friars of Santa Maria of Évora". Gonçalo Viegas, was the first grand master.

After the conquest of Aviz a castle erected there became the motherhouse of the order, and they were then called "Knights of St. Benedict of Aviz", since they adopted the Benedictine rule in 1162, as modified by John Ziritu, one of the earliest Cistercian abbots of Portugal. Like the Knights of Calatrava in Castile, the Knights of Portugal were indebted to the Cistercians for their rule and their habit—a white mantle with a green fleur-de-lysed cross. The Knights of Calatrava also surrendered some of their places in Portugal to them on condition that the Knights of Aviz should be subject to the visitation of their grand master. Hence the Knights of Aviz were sometimes regarded as a branch of the Calatravan Order, although they never ceased to have a Portuguese grand master, dependent for temporalities on the Portuguese King.

At the death of King Ferdinand (1383) war broke out between Castile and Portugal. When João I, who had been grand master of the Knights of Aviz, ascended the throne of Portugal, he forbade the knights to submit to Castilian authority, and consequently, when Gonsalvo de Guzman came to Aviz as Visitor, the knights, while according him hospitality, refused to recognise him as a superior. Guzman protested, and the point remained a subject of contention until the Council of Basle (1431), when Portugal was declared to be in the wrong. But the right of the Calatravans was never exercised, and the next grand master of the Knights of Aviz, Fernando Rodrigues de Sequeira, continued to assert supreme authority over them.

The mission of the military orders in Portugal seemed to end after the overthrow of Muslim domination, but the Portuguese expeditions across the sea opened up a new field for them. The conquest of Ceuta by King João I (1415), the attacks upon Tangier under João's son Duarte (1437) were also crusades, inspired by a religious spirit and sanctioned by similar Papal Bulls. The Knights of Aviz and the Knights of Christ from Order of Christ, scions of the Knights Templars, achieved deeds of valour, the former under the Prince Fernando, the latter under Henrique, brother of King Duarte. Fernando displayed a no less heroic forbearance during his six years of captivity among the Muslims, a long martyrdom which after his death placed him among the Blessed (Acta SS.,5 June).

This enthusiasm did not last, and the Crusade in Africa continued as a mercantile enterprise. After the grand mastership of the order had been vested in the King in perpetuity (1551), he availed himself of its income to reward any kind of service in the army or the fleet. If the wealth of the Knights of Aviz was not as great as that of the Knights of Christ, it was still quite large, drawn as it was from some forty-three commanderies. The religious spirit of the knights vanished, and they withdrew from their clerical brothers who continued alone the conventual life. They were dispensed from their vow of celibacy by Alexander VI (1502), who tolerated their marriage to prevent scandalous concubinage; Julius III (1551) allowed them to dispose freely of their personal properties. Nobility of birth remained the chief requirement of aspirants to the mantle, a requirement confirmed by a decree of 1604.

Secularization of the order

Pope Pius VI (1789) and Queen Mary I reformed the order into a secular institution. In 1834, when the civil government of Portugal abolished religious orders and monasteries, after the defeat of King Miguel in the Civil War, under the constitutional monarchy the order lost its properties. The ancient military orders were transformed by the liberal constitution and subsequent legislation into mere orders of merit. The privileges which once had been an essential part of the membership of the old military orders also ceased.

In 1910, when the Portuguese monarchy ended, the Republic of Portugal abolished all the orders except the Order of the Tower and Sword. However, in 1917, at the end of the Great War, some of these orders were re-established as mere orders of merit to reward outstanding services to the state, the office of grand master belonging to the head of state, the President of the Republic. The Military Order of Aviz, together with the other Portuguese Orders of Merit, had its statutes revised on several occasions, during the First Republic (1910–1926), then in 1962, and again in 1986.

The Military Order of Aviz, together with the Military Orders of Christ and of St. James of the Sword form the group of the "Ancient Military Orders", governed by a chancellor and a council of eight members, appointed by the President of the Republic, to assist him as grand master in all matters concerning the administration of the order. The order can only be conferred on military personnel, both Portuguese and foreign, for outstanding service. For Portuguese nationals, a minimum of seven years of service in the armed forces is required as well as an outstanding and exemplary service record. The regulations of the order suggest classes to be conferred according to military rank thus: 
Army Captains and Navy Lieutenants: Knight
Majors and Lieutenant-Commanders: Officer
Lieutenant Colonels and Commanders: Commander
Colonels, Brigadiers, Navy Captains and Rear Admirals (US RADM, Commodore/US RDML being a virtually non-existing rank in the Portuguese Navy): Grand Officer
Major Generals, Lieutenant Generals, Generals, Vice-Admirals and Admirals: Grand Cross.

However, a number of further provisions in the regulations of the order allow for exceptions to this general rule.

Grades
The Order of Aviz, as awarded by the Portuguese government today, comes in five classes:

Grand Cross (GCA), which wears the badge of the Order on a sash on the right shoulder, and the star of the Order in gold on the left chest; 
Grand Officer (GOA), which wears the badge of the Order on a necklet, and the star of the Order in gold on the left chest; 
Commander (ComA), which wears the badge of the Order on a necklet, and the star of the Order in silver on the left chest; 
Officer (OA), which wears the badge of the Order on a ribbon with rosette on the left chest; 
Knight (CvA) or Dame (DmA), which wears the badge of the Order on a plain ribbon on the left chest.

A sixth class, Grand Collar (GColA), outranking all previous, was introduced in 2021.

Insignia

The badge of the Order is a gilt cross with green enamel, similar to the Order's emblem illustrated here, but with a longer lower arm. During the monarchy the badge was topped by the Sacred Heart of Christ.
The star of the Order is an eight-pointed, faceted star, in gilt for Grand Cross and Grand Officer, and in silver for Commander. The central disc is in white enamel, with a miniature of the modern badge in it. During the monarchy the Sacred Heart of Christ was placed at the top of the star.
The ribbon of the Order is plain green.

Selected recipients

 Captain James Yeo, Royal Navy 1809
 Roberto Ivens, 1895.
 David Legge Brainard, American arctic explorer and Army officer
 Richard E. Byrd, American polar explorer and aviator
 1st Earl Mountbatten of Burma
 Hesketh Hesketh-Prichard, British Army Officer
 James L Jones, 2006
 Lieutenant General Baron Albert du Roy de Blicquy.

See also
Honorific orders of Portugal

Notes

References

For Documents:
Noronha, Constitucoes de S. Bento de Aviz (Lisbon. 1631).

For history: 
Jos. Da Purificao, Catalogo dos Mestres de Aviz, 1722 (Acad real de Historia);
Burro, Chronica de Cister, onde, etc.. (Lisbon. 1602); cf Almeida in Mem. Acad. Scient. Lisboa (1837);
Helyot, Dictionnaire des ordes religieux (1847), 1, 348-350;
Schefer, Gesch. Von Portugal (Gotha 1834-54);
Herculano, History of Portugal (Lisbon, 1554–73)
Olival, The Military Orders and the Portuguese Expansion (15th to 17th Centuries), Portuguese Studies Review Monograph Series, Vol. 3 (Peterborough, 2018).

 
Christian religious orders established in the 12th century
Aviz, Order of
1146 establishments in Europe
12th-century establishments in Portugal